X Games Minneapolis 2018 was an action sporting event that took place July 19–22, 2018, at U.S. Bank Stadium in downtown Minneapolis, Minnesota.

Medal count

Skateboard

BMX

Moto X

References

External links
 X Games

X Games
2018 in sports in Minnesota
Festivals in Minnesota
July 2018 sports events in the United States
2018 in multi-sport events
2018 in American sports
2018 in motorcycle sport